The Rohingya National Council (RNC) is a political congress of Rohingya groups, mainly from Rakhine State, Myanmar (Burma). It was founded on 28 November 1998 along with the Arakan Rohingya National Organisation (ARNO), which was formed from a merger of the Arakan Rohingya Islamic Front (ARIF) and the Rohingya Solidarity Organisation (RSO).

See also 
 Islam in Myanmar

References 

Rebel groups in Myanmar
Islam in Myanmar
Rakhine State
Insurgency